Maksim Yuryevich Vitus (born 11 February 1989) is a Belarusian professional footballer.

Career
Born in Vawkavysk, Vitus made his Belarusian Premier League debut with MTZ-RIPO in 2008.

Honours
Dinamo Brest
Belarusian Premier League champion: 2019
Belarusian Cup winner: 2016–17, 2017–18
Belarusian Super Cup winner: 2018, 2019, 2020

References

External links

1989 births
Living people
Belarusian footballers
Association football defenders
Olympic footballers of Belarus
Footballers at the 2012 Summer Olympics
Belarusian expatriate footballers
Expatriate footballers in Croatia
FC PMC Postavy players
FC Partizan Minsk players
FC Neman Grodno players
FC Dinamo Minsk players
RNK Split players
FC Dynamo Brest players